The Central Indiana & Western Railroad  is a short-line switching and terminal railroad in southwestern Madison County in Indiana.  It branches off a CSX line near the city of Anderson and runs approximately seven miles west-southwest, terminating at Lapel near the western border of the county.

About three miles of operation are on CSX. The line was formerly part of the Central Indiana Railway, which had been jointly owned by the New York Central Railroad and Pennsylvania Railroad.  

The primary traffic is glass-making materials and cullet shipped from South Anderson Yard to Lapel. Some grain traffic generated in Lapel is shipped to South Anderson.

References

External links
Bureau of Transportation Statistics: Freight Railroads Operating in Indiana by Class: 2000

Switching and terminal railroads
Indiana railroads
Transportation in Madison County, Indiana
Spin-offs of Conrail